The Mayor of Johannesburg is the chief executive of the City Council and the highest elected position in the city of Johannesburg, South Africa.

List of mayors 
 Johan Zulch de Villiers (1897–1900) Appointed by South African Republic Executive Committee
 Walter Alfred John O'Meara (1900–1902) Appointed by British Military Administration
 William St. John Carr (1902–1904)
 George H. Goch (1904–1905)
 John William Quinn (1905–1906)
 William K. Tucker (1906–1907)
 James Thompson (1907–1908)
 Charles Chudleigh (1908–1909)
 Harry Graumann (1909–1910)
 Harry J. Hofmeyr (1910–1911)
 J. D. Ellis (1911–1912)
 William Richard Boustred (1912–1913)
 Norman Anstey (1913–1915)
 John Wesley O'Hara (1915–1917)
 T. F. Allen (1917–1919)
 G. B. Steer (1919–1920)
 J. Christie (1920–1921)
 S. Hancock (1921–1922)
 L. Forsyth Allan (1922–1923)
 M. J. Harris (1923–1924)
 C. Walters (1924–1925)
 E. O. Leake (1925–1926)
 Alfred Law Palmer (1926–1927)
 W. H. Port (1927–1928)
 W. Fernhead (1928–1929)
 D. Anderson (1929–1930)
 George W. Nelson (1930–1931)
 D. F. Corlett (1931–1932)
 B. C. Vickers (1932–1933)
 D. Penry Roberts (1933–1934)
 Maurice Freeman (1934–1935)
 Maldwyn Edmund (1935–1936)
 Donald W. Mackay (1936–1937)
 J. S. Fotheringham (1937–1938)
 J. J. Page (1938–1939)
 T. A. M. Huddle (1939–1940)
 T. P. Gray (1940–1941)
 A. R. Thorburn (1941–1942)
 L. Leveson (1942–1943)
 A. S. Holland (1943–1944)
 A. Immink (1944–1945)
 Jessie McPherson (1945–1946)
 James Gray (1946–1947)
 G. B. Gordon (1947–1948)
 S. P. Lee (1948–1949)
 J. Mincer (1949–1950)
 C. F. Beckett (1950–1951)
 I. E. B. Attwell (1951–1952)
 Hyman Miller (1952–1953)
 C. J. H. Patmore (1953–1954)
 G. J. Beckett (1954–1955)
 Leslie Hurd (1955–1956)
 Max Goodman (1956–1957)
 T. Glyn Morris (1957–1958)
 Ian Maltz (1958–1959)
 Alec Gorshel (1959–1960)
 D. J. Marais (1960–1962)
 Keith J. Fleming (1962–1963)
 J. F. Oberholzer (1963–1964)
 P. M. Ross (1964–1965)
 Aleck Joffe (1965–1966)
 Boyce D. Eagar (1966–1967)
 C. J. Ross-Spencer (1967–1968)
 I. Schlapobersky (1968–1969)
 Patrick R. B. Lewis (1969–1970)
 S. Moss (1970–1971)
 Alf Widman (1971–1972)
 J. C. Lemmer (1972–1973)
 A. D. Bensusan (1973–1974)
 Harold Frank Dennis (1974–1975)
 Max Neppe (1975–1976)
 Monty Sklaar (1976–1977)
 Martin Powell (1977–1978)
 J. S. Otto (1978–1979)
 J. D. R. Opperman (1979–1980)
 Carel Venter (1980–1981)
 Cecil Long (1981–1982)
 Danie van Zyl (1982–1983)
 Alan Gadd (1983–1984)
 Eddy Magid (1984–1985)
 Ernie Fabel (1985–1986)
 Harold Rudolph (1986–1987)
 O. H. Fenn (1987–1988)
 J. H. van Blerk (1988)
 David J. Neppe (1988–1989)
 Koos Roets (1989–1990)
 William G. L. Janse van Rensburg (1990–1991)
 Elliot Kretzmer (1991–1992)
 J. S. Burger (1992–1993)
 Les Dishy (1993–1994)
 Dan Pretorius (1994)
 Isaac Mogase (1995–2000)
 Amos Masondo (2000–2011)
 Parks Tau (2011–2016)
 Herman Mashaba (2016–2019)
 Geoff Makhubo (2019–2021)
 Eunice Mgcina (acting, 2021)
 Jolidee Matongo (2021)
 Mpho Moerane (2021)
 Mpho Phalatse (2021–2022)
Dada Morero (2022–2022; disputed)
Mpho Phalatse (2022-2023)
Thapelo Amad (2023-present)

See also
 Timeline of Johannesburg

References

Johnannesburg